Cuzzie is an unincorporated community in Lincoln County, West Virginia, United States. Its post office  is closed.

Cuzzie Smith, an early postmaster, gave the community her name.

References

Unincorporated communities in Lincoln County, West Virginia
Unincorporated communities in West Virginia